"Love and Other Bruises" is the debut single by English/Australian soft rock duo Air Supply, from their 1976 self-titled debut album. The song was a top ten hit in Australia, where it peaked at No. 6. The song also appeared on the duo's third album of the same name, which was their first release in the United States.

Track listing 
Australia & UK 7" single
A. "Love and Other Bruises" - 3:40
B. "If You Knew Me" - 4:02

Charts

Weekly charts

Year-end charts

References

1976 songs
1976 debut singles
Air Supply songs
Songs written by Graham Russell
Song recordings produced by Peter Dawkins (musician)
CBS Records singles